Make Up is the debut extended play by South Korean singer Hyomin. It was released on June 30, 2014, by Core Contents Media. "Nice Body" was released as the lead single.

After making an announcement that two members of T-ara would be making their solo debuts, Core Contents Media released a teaser of Hyomin on April 29, followed by another teaser and another announcement about the name of the single and EP on June 2.

Release and promotion 
On May 29, 2014, Hyomin expressed through her agency that she wouldmake her solo debut in the music scene, and the name of the new album will be announced on June 2. Hyomin released the album concept photo on June 11. On June 16, the agency stated that Hyomin's album will be released and on June 2. On June 27, the agency stated that Hyomin's album will be released ahead of schedule on June 30

A press conference for the release of the new album was held at JBK TOWER in Samseong-dong, Gangnam, Seoul .

Hyomin made her solo debut stage on the July 4 episode of KBS' Music Bank.

The full music video for "Nice Body" and full EP were released on the June 30, 2014.

Creative background 
Hyomin said in an interview on July 2 that "34-24-36" in the music video for the title song "Nice Body" represents a woman's perfect body. In the music video of the title song "Nice Body" of this album, Hyomin puts her body in an extreme state of two poses . A regular version and a dance version of the music video were both released on June 30, 2014, the same day as the album's release.

In the interview, Hyomin stated that the creative background of her first self-written song "Overcome" is to convey the meaning of "you can do it, you can stand up" to people in real life .

Hyomin participated in the production of the album's costumes, hair styling, packaging, choreography, music video, design, etc.

Track listing

Reception

Critical reception 
The album received mixed reviews as the album tracks were praised while the controversial music video caused critics to doubt the song's intentions. Scott Interrante of PopMatters praised the music video's ability the bring attention to current beauty standards "it may actually be trying to bring attention to the ridiculous standards we place on women and pop stars in our society". He also described the song as strong, fun and summery.

Commercial performance 
"Nice Body" charted at number 13 on the Gaon Weekly Single Chart for digital releases.

Chart performance

Albums chart

Singles

Sales and certifications

Release history

References

External links
 

T-ara albums
2014 debut EPs
Korean-language EPs
Dance-pop EPs
Genie Music EPs